The El Paso Public Library is a Carnegie library located at 149 West First Street in El Paso, Illinois, United States. The library building was built in 1906-07 to house the city's library, which originated in 1873. Architect Paul O. Moratz designed the building in the Richardsonian Romanesque style. The library was added to the National Register of Historic Places in 1994.

History
The library's existence dates back to 1873, when the Ladies' Library Association formed in El Paso. The library was originally kept in a room of the Eagle Block Building; however, when that building burned down in 1894, the library was destroyed. Following the fire, the new library took on a temporary home while the Ladies' Library Association discussed finding a permanent building and giving the city control over the library. The city assumed ownership of the library in 1904 and approved a library tax the following year. In 1906, the city received a $6000 grant from the Carnegie Foundation for a library building. The library was completed the following year and dedicated on February 22, 1907; its collection included 1300 books from the library association and 500 new books ordered for the new building, and El Paso's citizens donated $1000 to purchase even more books.

Architecture

Paul O. Moratz of Bloomington, who was also noteworthy for his work on his home city's White Place neighborhood, designed the library. Moratz gave the library a Richardsonian Romanesque design inspired by the Morgan Park Library in Chicago. The two-story building has a buff stone exterior with a brick foundation. Round turrets rise on either side of the library's front entrance; the turrets are linked by a segmental arch above the front door. The building's hip roof features exposed rafter tails all around and dentillated eaves above the entrance. The library was added to the National Register of Historic Places in 1994.

References

Libraries on the National Register of Historic Places in Illinois
Romanesque Revival architecture in Illinois
Library buildings completed in 1907
National Register of Historic Places in Woodford County, Illinois
Carnegie libraries in Illinois